

Campfield Kettle Hole is the name given to a Site of Special Scientific Interest (SSSI) in north Northumberland, England. The site is thought to be the remains of a kettle hole, a pond formed in the void remaining after a submerged glacial calf block melted. In contemporary times Campfield Kettle Hole is a mix of bog and pond.

Location and natural features
The western end is a permanent pond; the eastern-end is prone to occasional flooding; the remainder of the pond has become peat-filled.

Vegetation
The kettle hole has deep waterlogged peat soils supporting a carr woodland of birch (Betula sp.) with Scot’s pine (Pinus sylvestris). The woodland floor has bog-mosses (Sphagnum spp.), and hare’s-tail cotton grass (Eriophorum vaginatum) with purple moor-grass (Molinia caerulea) and wavy hair-grass (Deschampsia flexuosa).

The western end of the pond is fringed with yellow iris (Iris pseudacorus), water plantain (Alisma plantago-aquatica) and willow (Salix spp). The perimeter has yellow iris and reed canary-grass (Phalaris arundinacea). The uncommon beetle Agabus uliginosus dispar has been recorded from the wetter areas of the site.

The condition of Campfield Kettle Hole was judged to be unfavourable-recovering in 2013, with previous concerns about tree encroachment settled.

See also
List of Sites of Special Scientific Interest in Northumberland

References

External links
Natural England SSSI record for Campfield Kettle Hole

Ponds of Europe
Sites of Special Scientific Interest in Northumberland
Sites of Special Scientific Interest notified in 1969